Places called Newton in the United Kingdom include:

England
 Newton Longville, Buckinghamshire
 Newton Blossomville, Buckinghamshire
 Newton, South Cambridgeshire, Cambridgeshire
 Newton-in-the-Isle, Isle of Ely, Cambridgeshire
  Newton, Chester, Cheshire
 Newton, a hamlet in Kingsley, Cheshire, near Frodsham
 Newton, a hamlet in Middlewich, Cheshire
 Newton, a hamlet in Mottram St Andrew, Cheshire, near Prestbury
 Newton by Daresbury, in Daresbury, Cheshire
 Newton by Malpas, Cheshire
 Newton-by-Tattenhall, Cheshire
 Newton, Cornwall
 Newton-in-Furness, Cumbria
 Newton, Derbyshire
 Newton Abbot, Devon
 Newton Ferrers, Devon
 Newton St Cyres, Devon
 Newton Tracey, Devon
 Newton, Dorset
 Sturminster Newton, Dorset
 Newton Aycliffe, Durham
 Archdeacon Newton, Durham
 Newton, South Gloucestershire, Gloucestershire
 Newton, Greater Manchester, a suburb of Hyde formerly in Cheshire
 Newton Heath (formerly Newton), Greater Manchester
 Newton, Golden Valley, Herefordshire
 Newton, Hampton Court, Herefordshire
 Walford, Letton and Newton, Herefordshire
  Newton, Fylde, Lancashire
 Newton, Lancaster, Lancashire
 Newton-in-Bowland, Lancashire
 Newton-with-Scales, Lancashire
 Hardhorn with Newton, Lancashire
 Newton Burgoland, Leicestershire
 Newton Harcourt, Leicestershire
 Newton, Lincolnshire
 Newton-le-Willows, Merseyside
 Newton, Merseyside, on the Wirral
 Newton, Norfolk
 Newton Bromswold, Northamptonshire
 Newton, Northumberland, in Bywell parish
 Newton-by-the-Sea, Northumberland, a civil parish
 Newton Kyme, North Yorkshire
 Newton on the Moor, Northumberland
Newton-on-Ouse, North Yorkshire
Newton-on-Rawcliffe, North Yorkshire, in Newton civil parish
 Newton Morrell, North Yorkshire
 Newton Mulgrave, North Yorkshire
 Newton-le-Willows, North Yorkshire
 Newton under Roseberry, North Yorkshire
 Newton, Nottinghamshire
 RAF Newton, Nottinghamshire
 Newton Morrell, Oxfordshire, Oxfordshire
 Newton Purcell, Oxfordshire
 Newton, Shropshire, an area of Craven Arms
 Newton, Doncaster, South Yorkshire
 Newton, Suffolk (also known as Newton Green)
 Newton, Warwickshire
 Newton Regis, Warwickshire
 Newton, West Midlands, a ward in Sandwell
 Potternewton, West Yorkshire

Scotland
Newton, Argyll on the Cowal peninsula, Argyll and Bute
 Newton, Midlothian near to Danderhall
 Newton, North Uist, Na h-Eileanan an Siar
 Newton, Scottish Borders, part of Nenthorn
 Newton, South Lanarkshire, near to Cambuslang
 Newton railway station serving the above community 
 Newton, West Lothian
 Newton Mearns, East Renfrewshire
 Newton of Ardtoe, Highland
 Newton-on-Ayr railway station, South Ayrshire
 Newton Stewart, Dumfries and Galloway
 Newton Wamphray, Dumfries and Galloway
 Barony of Newton, Stirlingshire
 Newtongrange, Midlothian
 Newtonmore, Highland

Wales
 Newton, Brecknockshire
 Newton, Porthcawl
 Newton, Swansea

Newton